Quinton Robert Hosley (born March 25, 1984) is an American-born naturalized Georgian professional basketball player for Stelmet Zielona Góra of the Polish Basketball League. He is a 2.01 m (6 ft 7 in) tall swingman.  He is the son of streetball and Rucker Park legend Ron Mathias.

Collegiate career
He played two seasons of the college basketball at Lamar Community College and Fresno State University. His career averages are 16.1 points and 9 rebounds per game.

Professional career
After going undrafted in the 2007 NBA draft, Hosley joined the Turkish League team Pınar Karşıyaka in 2007. In 2008, he joined the Spanish ACB League team Real Madrid. After being released from Real Madrid due to poor performances, Hosley signed a contract with the Turkish team Galatasaray Café Crown.

On October 23, 2010, he agreed to a deal with another Turkish team Aliağa Petkim.

In the summer of 2010, Hosley signed a two-year deal with DKV Joventut of the Spanish ACB League.

In July 2011, he signed with Italian club Dinamo Basket Sassari.

On August 8, 2012, he signed a one-year contract with the 2012 Polish League Bronze Medalist Stelmet Zielona Góra. In 2013, Hosley won the Polish League Championship (first championship in the history of Zielona Góra). He has also become the Finals MVP.

On July 8, 2013, Hosley signed with Virtus Roma of Italy for the 2013–14 season.

In July 2014, Hosley returned to Zielona Góra signing a contract for the 2014–15 season. He was once again named the PLK Finals MVP in 2015, after Zielona Gora beat PGE Turów Zgorzelec 4–2 in the Finals.

On August 3, 2015, he signed a one-year deal with Krasny Oktyabr of Russia. One month later, on September 3, he parted ways with Krasny Oktyabr before appearing in a game for them. On October 6, 2015, he signed with Turkish club Yeşilgiresun Belediye for the rest of the season.

On July 21, 2016, Hosley signed with French club Nanterre 92. However, he left Nanterre before appearing in a game for them. In October 2016, he signed with Iranian club Shahrdari Arak for the 2016–17 season.

On October 5, 2017, Hosley signed with his former club Yeşilgiresun Belediye for the 2017–18 BSL season. On January 31, 2018, he moved to Polish club Anwil Włocławek for the rest of the season.

Georgian national team
Hosley played for the Georgia national basketball team in 2010.

Career statistics

College

EuroLeague

|-
| style="text-align:left;"| 2008–09
| style="text-align:left;"| Real Madrid
| 13 || 7 || 16.3 || .463 || .348 || .718 || 3.2 || .5 || .8 || .5 || 8.6 || 8.8
|- class="sortbottom"
| style="text-align:left;"| Career
| style="text-align:left;"|
| 13 || 7 || 16.3 || .463 || .348 || .718 || 3.2 || .5 || .8 || .5 || 8.6 || 8.8

References

External links

 Quinton Hosley at acb.com 
 Quinton Hosley at euroleague.net
 Quinton Hosley at legabasket.it 
 Quinton Hosley at plk.pl 
 Quinton Hosley at tblstat.net
 

1984 births
Living people
African-American basketball players
Aliağa Petkim basketball players
American expatriate basketball people in Iran
American expatriate basketball people in Italy
American expatriate basketball people in Poland
American expatriate basketball people in Spain
American expatriate basketball people in Turkey
American men's basketball players
Basketball players from New York City
Basket Zielona Góra players
Dinamo Sassari players
Fresno State Bulldogs men's basketball players
Galatasaray S.K. (men's basketball) players
Joventut Badalona players
Junior college men's basketball players in the United States
Karşıyaka basketball players
KK Włocławek players
Lamar Community College alumni
Liga ACB players
Pallacanestro Virtus Roma players
Real Madrid Baloncesto players
Shooting guards
Small forwards
Sportspeople from Brooklyn
Yeşilgiresun Belediye players
21st-century African-American sportspeople
20th-century African-American people